Amirul Asyraf bin Mohd Suhaidi (born 4 March 1994 in Penang) is a Malaysian professional football player who plays as a goalkeeper.

References

External links
 

Living people
Malaysian footballers
Penang F.C. players
1994 births
Malaysian people of Malay descent
People from Penang
Association football goalkeepers